Cornice Lake is an alpine lake in Custer County, Idaho, United States, located in the White Cloud Mountains in the Sawtooth National Recreation Area.  The lake is in the Four Lakes Basin and is most easily accessed from Sawtooth National Forest trail 683.

Cornice Lake is just east of Patterson Peak and west of Castle and Merriam Peaks.  It is downstream of Emerald, Rock, and Glacier Lakes and upstream of Quiet, Noisy, and Baker Lakes.

References

See also
 List of lakes of the White Cloud Mountains
 Sawtooth National Recreation Area
 White Cloud Mountains

Lakes of Idaho
Lakes of Custer County, Idaho
Glacial lakes of the United States
Glacial lakes of the Sawtooth National Forest